The Dixon Ticonderoga Company is an office and art supplies maker from the United States, with headquarters in Heathrow, Florida. The company offers a number of brands, with one of the most well-known being Ticonderoga: the yellow No. 2 pencil known for its distinctive green and yellow ferrule. Other brands include Dixon and Oriole pencils, Dixon Industrial products, Prang school and art supplies, and Lyra art products.

History
The company was formed by the merger of Joseph Dixon Crucible Company of New Jersey with Bryn Mawr Corporation of Pennsylvania, dating to 1795. The company was founded by Joseph Dixon and his son. Dixon also acquired 200-year-old German-based manufacturer Lyra. The pencil's name originates in the graphite ore discovered on Lead Mountain in 1815 and processed in Ticonderoga, New York.

In 2002, the company closed down its Sandusky, Ohio factory shifting the manufacturing operations to Mexico. In 2005, the company was acquired by F.I.L.A., a manufacturer of school and art supplies based in Milan, Italy, and announced the closure of its main US factory in Versailles, Missouri. The company retains a distribution center in Georgia, where it makes limited numbers of pencils in order to claim status as a domestic producer, and a headquarters facility in Heathrow, Florida.

A consultant and former director of business development for the Dixon Ticonderoga company has been Lee Corso (who is better known as a sports broadcaster on ESPN). According to USA Today, his on-air trademark is waving a pencil to punctuate his speech.

Ticonderoga pencil

The Classic Ticonderoga is a wood-cased graphite pencil. It is well-known for having a characteristic yellow color, a now green (originally brass) metallic ferrule, and a soft pink eraser. The pencil has a mild hexagonal shape that slows surface rolling. Its thickness is approximately 7mm, and its unsharpened length is 19cm. The Ticonderoga was traditionally manufactured from Eastern red cedar, but it is now made from an unspecified American cedar.        

The eponymous Ticonderoga model pencil is distributed by the Dixon Ticonderoga Company. The company, which was originally located in downtown Jersey City, New Jersey, was founded in the 19th century. In 1999, Dixon ceased US production of the Ticonderoga Pencil, but it continues to own and operate facilities outside the US in Italy, France, Asia, Latin America and Germany.

Dixon Ticonderoga manufacture a variety of pencils, including the Classic, Black, Noir, Tri-Conderoga, Microban, Laddie, My First (formerly Beginners), SenseMatic, and colored pencils. The pencils are available in different grades: #1 (Extra Soft), #2 (Soft), #2½ (Medium), #3 (Hard), and #4 (Extra Hard).

Ticonderoga pencils were the favorite pencil of the author Roald Dahl. Dahl began using them, along with yellow lined legal pads, whilst living in the U.S, and upon returning home to the U.K. had them specially shipped over for use in his writing shed at Gipsy House, his home in Buckinghamshire.

Brands 

 Prang
 GoWrite!
 Pacon
 WonderFoam
 KolorFast
 Dixon
 Ticonderoga
 Ghostline
 Princeton Artist Brush

References

External links

American subsidiaries of foreign companies
Manufacturing companies based in Florida
Companies based in Seminole County, Florida
2005 mergers and acquisitions
Pencil brands